Alpha Barry (born 1 January 1970) is a Burkinabé politician and journalist. He served as the Minister of Foreign Affairs from 2016 to 2021.

Biography
Barry is born on 1 January 1970 in Ivory Coast. His birth name is Alpha Mamadou Barry. He has been a correspondent of RFI in Ouagadougou and collaborator of magazine Jeune Afrique.

12 January 2016, he is appointed the Minister of Foreign Affairs of Burkina Faso.

Health
During the 2020 coronavirus outbreak, on 20 March, Barry contracted the coronavirus.

References

1970 births
Living people
Foreign ministers of Burkina Faso
21st-century Burkinabé people